Amphilimnidae is a family of echinoderms belonging to the order Amphilepidida.

Genera:
 Amphilimna Verrill, 1899
 Astrosombra Thuy, Gale & Numberger-Thuy, 2019

References

Amphilepipida
Echinoderm families